Frank Benjamin Havens (August 1, 1924 – July 22, 2018) was an American sprint canoeist who competed from the late 1940s to the early 1960s. He was born in Arlington, Virginia. Competing in four Summer Olympics, he won two medals in the C-1 10000 m event with a silver in 1948 and a gold in 1952. In Havens' first shot in the 1948 Olympic games, he finished second to Capek by 35.4 seconds in a canoe he borrowed from the Czechs. In 1952 his world record was set in a canoe he and his brother, Bill, imported from Sweden for about $160. He is, as of 2022, the only American Olympic gold medal winner in a singles canoeing event. He was a member of the Virginia Sports Hall of Fame and an American Canoe Association Legend of Paddling. He died in July 2018 at the age of 93.

References

1924 births
2018 deaths
American male canoeists
People from Arlington County, Virginia
Canoeists at the 1948 Summer Olympics
Canoeists at the 1952 Summer Olympics
Canoeists at the 1956 Summer Olympics
Canoeists at the 1960 Summer Olympics
Medalists at the 1948 Summer Olympics
Medalists at the 1952 Summer Olympics
Olympic gold medalists for the United States in canoeing
Olympic silver medalists for the United States in canoeing